The CAC CA-15, also known unofficially as the CAC Kangaroo, was an Australian propeller-driven fighter aircraft designed by the  Commonwealth Aircraft Corporation (CAC)  during World War II. Due to protracted development, the project was not completed until after the war, and was cancelled after flight testing, when the advent of jet aircraft was imminent.

Design and development

During 1943, following its success in rapidly designing and mass-producing the Boomerang fighter for the Royal Australian Air Force (RAAF), CAC began design work on a fully-fledged interceptor and escort fighter. Because the Boomerang had become more and more obsolete against Japanese fighters like the Mitsubishi A6M Zero, Sir Lawrence Wackett (as head of CAC) proposed designing a new high-performance fighter from scratch. Fred David, who had designed the Boomerang, was to lead an in-house design team at CAC. In June 1943, the design concept proposal was approved by the government and RAAF, which issued specification 2/43, enabling work to commence.

The design was inspired by contemporary fighters – especially the German  Focke-Wulf Fw 190, details of which were available to the designers through Allied intelligence reports on captured aircraft. Although the CA-15 bore a superficial resemblance to the North American P-51 Mustang, the CAC design was not based directly on the American aircraft and had quite different performance objectives. For much of its development, the CA-15 was designed around radial engines, rather than the inline engines used in fighters like the Mustang. In fact, development of the CA-15 was slowed by a recommendation from Wackett, that CAC build Mustangs under licence, rather than bear the cost of developing a unique design. Nevertheless, it was believed that the CA-15 promised capabilities that would enable it to replace the P-51.

At first, the CAC designers planned to use the 2,300 hp (1,715 kW) radial Pratt & Whitney R-2800, with a turbocharger. However, that engine became unavailable, causing further delays in development, and it was decided to fit an in-line Rolls-Royce Griffon Mk 61 (2,035 hp/1,517 kW). Engines for a prototype were leased from Rolls-Royce. It was intended that any production engines would have a three-stage supercharger.

Operational history

Development was further slowed by the end of the war, with the prototype flying for the first time on 4 March 1946, and was flown by CAC test pilot Jim Schofield, who also flew the first Australian built P-51. The prototype was assigned RAAF serial number A62-1001. According to aviation historian Darren Crick, it achieved a calibrated level flight speed of 448 mph (721 km/h) at 26,400 ft (8,046 m). Test flights came to an abrupt ending when Flt Lt J. A. L. Archer suffered a hydraulic failure (later found to be a leaking ground test gauge) on approach to Point Cook on 10 December 1946, which left him no choice but to orbit and burn off fuel. The main gear was only halfway down and unable to be retracted or lowered any further but the tail wheel was down and locked. On landing, the tail wheel struck the airstrip first causing the aircraft to porpoise and finally, the airscoop dug in. The aircraft settled back on the fuselage and skidded to a stop, heavily damaged. After repairs at CAC, the aircraft was returned to ARDU in 1948. Archer reportedly achieved a speed of 502.2 mph (803 km/h) over Melbourne, after levelling out of a dive of 4,000 ft (1,200 m), on 25 May 1948.

By this time, however, it was clear that jet aircraft had far greater potential and no further examples of the CA-15 were built. The prototype was scrapped in 1950, and the engines were returned to Rolls-Royce.

Operators

Royal Australian Air Force

Specifications

See also

References

Notes

Bibliography

 Crick, Darren. "RAAF A62 CAC CA-15"  adf-serials.com, 2003.
 Donald, David. "Commonwealth CA-15: The 'Kangaroo' Fighter". Wings of Fame, Volume 4, 1996, pp. 118–121. London: Aerospace Publishing. . ISSN 1361-2034.
 Francillon, René J. The Royal Australian Air Force & Royal New Zealand Air Force in the Pacific. Fallbrook, California: Aero Publishers Inc., 1970. .
 Green, William, ed. "Antipodean Finale". Air Enthusiast, October 1972, Vol. 3. No 4, pp. 178–180.
 
 Ross, A.T. Armed and Ready: The Industrial Development and Defence of Australia 1900-1945. Wahroonga, New South Wales, Australia: Turton & Armstrong, 1995. .
 Wilson, Stewart. Wirraway, Boomerang & CA-15 in Australian Service. Fyshwick ACT, Australia: Aerospace Publications Pty. Ltd., 1991. .

External links

 RAAF Museum, "A62 CAC CA 15"
 Felix Noble, "CAC CA-15"

CA-15
1940s Australian fighter aircraft
Single-engined tractor aircraft
Low-wing aircraft
Abandoned military aircraft projects of Australia
Aircraft first flown in 1946